Jan Johnson (born November 11, 1950 in Hammond, Indiana) is an American former athlete who competed mainly in the pole vault. He graduated in 1972 from the University of Alabama, where he holds the school record in the pole vault at 18 feet, 1/2 inch.

He competed for the United States in the 1972 Summer Olympics held in Munich, Germany, where he won the bronze medal.

Johnson held a world indoor record at 17 feet, 7 inches while competing for the University of Kansas. He transferred to Alabama, where he became a three-time NCAA champion.  He won the 1971 USA Outdoor Track and Field Championships for the Alabama Crimson Tide. He was also an accomplished long jumper and sprinter in both high school and college.

Johnson won the 1968 Illinois state high school championship while competing at Bloom High School in Chicago Heights, Illinois. In 1972, the gymnasium of Rickover Junior High School in Sauk Village, Illinois was dedicated and named in his honor. His younger brother Tim Johnson, set the National HS indoor record of 16'7 in 1974. His daughter, Chelsea, became a two-time NCAA outdoor champion in the pole vault for UCLA. Chelsea was silver medalist for the US in the women's pole vault at the 2009 World Championships in Athletics in Berlin.

Jan Johnson runs "Sky Jumpers," a pole vault camp based on the central coast of California.  Johnson also hosts auxiliary "Sky Jumpers" camps annually in Illinois, Ohio, Pennsylvania, and Wisconsin. Johnson has been an outspoken innovator and advocate for pole vault safety. He co-authored The Illustrated History of the Pole Vault, published in 2007. His second book: "The High Flyer and the Cultural Revolution"  has recently been published to high reviews.

References

External links
 
 Official Website

1950 births
Living people
American male pole vaulters
Olympic bronze medalists for the United States in track and field
Athletes (track and field) at the 1972 Summer Olympics
Athletes (track and field) at the 1971 Pan American Games
Medalists at the 1972 Summer Olympics
Pan American Games gold medalists for the United States
Pan American Games medalists in athletics (track and field)
People from Sauk Village, Illinois
Sportspeople from Cook County, Illinois
Track and field athletes from Illinois
Track and Field books
Medalists at the 1971 Pan American Games